In the history of English phonology, there have been many diachronic sound changes affecting vowels, especially involving phonemic splits and mergers.

Great Vowel Shift and trisyllabic laxing

The Great Vowel Shift was a series of chain shifts that affected historical long vowels but left short vowels largely alone. It is one of the primary causes of the idiosyncrasies in English spelling.

The shortening of ante-penultimate syllables in Middle English created many long–short pairs. The result can be seen in such words as,

Tense–lax neutralization 
Tense–lax neutralization refers to a neutralization, in a particular phonological context in a particular language, of the normal distinction between tense and lax vowels.

In some varieties of English, this occurs in particular before  and (in rhotic dialects) before coda  (that is,  followed by a consonant or at the end of a word); it also occurs, to a lesser extent, before tautosyllabic .

For these speakers, words with  like beg, egg, Greg, keg, leg and peg rhyme with words with   like Craig, Hague, plague and vague.

Some varieties (including most American English dialects) have significant vocalic neutralization before intervocalic , as well. See English-language vowel changes before historic /r/.

Monophthongs

Low front vowels 

/æ/ tensing is a process that occurs in some accents of North American and some Australian English whereby the vowel  is raised and lengthened or diphthongised in various environments. In some dialects it involves an allophonic split whilst in others it affects all s. There are dialects, however, where the split is phonological.
The bad–lad split is a phonological split of the Early Modern English short vowel phoneme  into a short  and a long . This split is found in some varieties of English in England and Australia.
In Modern English, a new phoneme, developed that did not exist in Middle English.
It occurs mainly in southern varieties of English English, the Boston accent and the Southern Hemisphere accents (although it is somewhat variable in Australia).

Low back vowels 

The father–bother merger is a merger of the Early Modern English vowels  and  that occurs in almost all varieties of North American English.
The lot–cloth split is the result of a late 17th-century sound change that lengthened  to  before voiceless fricatives (off, broth, cost), voiced velars (dog, long) and also before  in the word gone.
The cot–caught merger is a phonemic merger that occurs in some varieties of English causing the vowel in words like cot, rock, and doll to be pronounced the same as the vowel in the words caught, talk, law, and small.
In Australian English they are distinguished only by vowel length.

High back vowels 

The foot–goose merger is a phonemic merger of the vowels  and  found in distinct dialects of English: Scotland, Northern Ireland and the far north of England use  for both these sets of words.

High front vowels 

As a result of this merger the words rabbit and abbot rhyme.
The kit split is a split of EME  found in South African English, where kit  and bit  do not rhyme.
Happy tensing is the process in which final lax  becomes tense  in words like happy.
The meet–meat merger is the merger of the Early Modern English vowel  with the vowel . The merger is complete outside the British Isles and virtually complete within them.

Schwa 
Schwa syncope is the deletion of schwa. English has the tendency to delete schwa when it appears in a mid-word syllable that comes after the stressed syllable. Kenstowicz (1994) states that "... American English schwa deletes in medial posttonic syllables ...", and gives as examples words such as sep(a)rate (as an adjective), choc(o)late, cam(e)ra and elab(o)rate (as an adjective), where the schwa (represented by the letters in parentheses) has a tendency to be deleted.

Diphthongs 

The vein–vain merger is the merger of the Middle English diphthongs  and  that occurs in all dialects of present English.
The following mergers are grouped together by Wells as the long mid mergers. They occur in all but a few dialects of English.
The pane–pain merger is a merger of the long mid monophthong  and the diphthong .
The pride–proud merger is a merger of the diphthongs  and  before voiced consonants occurring for some speakers of African American Vernacular English.
The rode–road merger is the merger of /oː/ and /oə/ occurring for most English speakers. Some Welsh English speakers distinguish "rode" /roːd/ and "cole" /koːl/ from "road" /roəd/ and "coal" /koəl/.
The muse–mews merger is the merger of /yː/ and /ɪu/ occurring for most English speakers. Some Welsh English speakers distinguish "muse" /myːz/ and "due" /dyː/ from "mews" /mɪuz/ and "dew" /dɪu/.
The line–loin merger is a merger between the diphthongs  and  that occurs in some English dialects.
It is particularly associated with the dialects of New York City and New Orleans.

Vowel changes before historic /r/

Mergers before intervocalic /r/ 
Mergers before intervocalic r are quite widespread in North American English.

Mergers before historic coda /r/ 
Various mergers before historic coda r are very common in English dialects.

 The –– merger is found in some accents of Southern British English. It causes tire, tower, and tar to be homophones. The – merger is found in some Midland and Southern U.S. accents. It causes tire and tar to be homophones.
 The square–nurse merger occurs in some areas of England.
 The – merger occurs for many speakers of English. It caused power and sour to rhyme.

Vowel changes before historic /l/ 

 The hull–hole merger is a conditioned merger of /ʌ/ and /oʊ/ before /l/ occurring for some speakers of English English with l-vocalization.
 The doll–dole merger is a conditioned merger, for some Londoners, of /ɒ/ and /əʊ/ before nonprevocalic /l/.
 The vile–vial merger involves a partial or complete dephonologicalization of schwa after a vowel and before coda .
 Four other conditioned mergers before  which require more study have been mentioned in the literature and are as follows:

See also 
Great Vowel Shift
List of dialects of the English language
Phonological history of English
Phonological history of English consonants
Trisyllabic laxing

References 

English phonology
Vowel shifts
History of the English language